Toomas Kall (pseudonym Uku-Ralf Tobi; born on 16 October 1947 in Tallinn) is an Estonian humorist, caricaturist, writer, scenarist and translator.

Career
1966-1969 he studied history, and 1970-1972 Estonian philology at Tartu State University. From 1971 until 1978, he worked at the newspaper Sirp ja Vasar. From 1980 until 1987, he worked at Vanalinnastuudio. From 1990 until 1994, he was the chief editor of the newspaper Sirp. Since 1994 he is a freelancer. He has also worked as a film and television screenwriter.

In 1980, Kall was a signatory of the Letter of 40 intellectuals; a public letter in which 40 intellectuals attempted to defend the Estonian language and expressed their protest against the recklessness of the Republic-level government in dealing with youth protests that were sparked a week earlier due to the banning of a public performance of the band Propeller. The real reasons were much more deep-seated, and had to do primarily with the Russification policies of the Kremlin in occupied Estonia.

Awards
 2006: Order of the National Coat of Arms, IV class.

Works

Screenwritings
 1973: Värvipliiatsid, Tallinnfilm, animated film
 1983: Sõlm, Tallinnfilm, puppetry film
 1986: Kevadine kärbes, Tallinnfilm, puppetry film
 1987: Magus planeet, Tallinnfilm, puppetry film
 1991: Ärasõit, Tallinnfilm, animated film
 1991: Rahu tänav, Tallinnfilm, feature film
 1995–1998: M Klubi, BEC, television series
 1997: Minu Leninid, Faama Film, feature film
 2001–2011: Pehmed ja karvased, BEC, television series
 2002: Eesti valik 2001, Raamatfilm, documentary film
 2005: Mees animatsoonist, Acuba Film, documentary film

References

1947 births
Living people
Estonian male writers
20th-century Estonian writers
21st-century Estonian writers
Estonian humorists
Estonian caricaturists
Estonian journalists
Estonian screenwriters
Writers from Tallinn
People from Tallinn
University of Tartu alumni
Recipients of the Order of the National Coat of Arms, 4th Class